The Fifield Site (Pr-55) is located on Damon Run Creek in Porter County, north-western Indiana. It is classified as a late prehistoric, single-component Upper Mississippian Fisher village.

History of archaeological investigations 

Initial excavations were conducted by Robert Skinner in 1949. Follow-up excavations were undertaken by Robert Reichert from 1950 through 1959.  Charles Faulkner examined collections from these excavations and performed an analysis which was published in 1972.

Results of Faulkner’s Analysis 

The excavations yielded features, Prehistoric artefacts, animal bone, and plant remains.

Features 

Approximately 45 features were encountered during excavations.  Most were reported as basin-shaped, storage-refuse pits.  There were 8 features showing firing in the bottom that were interpreted as roasting pits.

Several post moulds were uncovered during the Reichert excavations.  No house patterns were discerned but Reichert felt that the patterns of post molds indicated structures with rounded walls.

Animal bone 

Approximately 2,713 animal bones were recovered.  The most common types of animal remains were deer, dog, elk, beaver, raccoon, bear, bison and turkey. These bones were not modified into tools like the bone tools described in the Artifacts section below, and may be considered food remains.

Artifacts 

Artifacts recovered from the site included:

 Pottery (2,450 sherds from pottery vessels, of which 2,434 are from the Fisher component) - No whole or completely reconstructable vessels were found at the site. Therefore the researchers looked primarily at rim sherds and distinctive body sherds to analyze the pottery.  The pottery artifacts will be described in more detail below
 Stone artifacts 262 chipped stone tools: including 215 projectile points (of which 104 are small triangular points); biface knives (16); humpback end scrapers (22); and drills (20 double-pointed and 5 expanded-hafting area)
 Ground stone artifacts (9) - including 4 abraders (aka arrowshaft straighteners), 3 celts, 1 pipe fragment and one piece of hematite used to obtain red pigment for paint
 Bone and antler artifacts (61) - including 3 fishhook blanks, 5 antler projectile points, 1 antler harpoon 3 bison scapula hoes, 9 deer cannon bone beamers, 4 bird bone needles, 1 scapula scraper, 8 bone awls, 1 beaver incisor chisel, 1 scapula blade, 2 bird bone beads, 1 antler comb or hairpin, 10 antler cylinders/game pieces, 1 rasp (musical instrument) and 1 whistle
 Copper artifacts (2) - including a copper pendant and a rare serpent figurine
 Sherd pendant (1) with “weeping eye” motif
 Stone pipe fragment (1)
 Circular sherd disc (1)

Reichert's excavations uncovered a cache of domestic implements fashioned from bone and antler, overlain by a layer of what appeared to be red ochre:

 4 deer cannon-bone beamers
 Bone scraper made from elk or bison bone
 Unmodified piece of cannon-bone which may have been raw material for a tool
 Four needles made of bird bone
 Antler harpoon
 
These implements would have been used for domestic activities such as processing animal hide, sewing reed mats and making clothes.  The cache may have had ceremonial significance because of the presence of red ochre, which was known in early Historic times to be used in a ceremonial context.

Some of the most prominent and diagnostic non-pottery artifacts are summarized and/or illustrated here:

Fisher ware pottery 

After 1000 AD, there was increased interaction and influence from the Mississippian cultures of the Mississippi River Valley.  The local cultures in the Great Lakes region and surrounding areas influenced by the Mississippians are designated as Upper Mississippians by archaeologists.  Some of the cultures designated as Upper Mississippian are the Oneota complex with its various foci. Fisher is closely related to Oneota and some archaeologists consider it to be a focus of Oneota.

Fisher ware was first described at the Fisher Mound site in northeastern Illinois near the mouth of the Illinois River.  It has also been noted at the Anker and Boumanville sites near Chicago, Illinois, and the Griesmer site in Indiana.

This pottery is characterized by shell tempering, predominantly cordmarked surfaces, trailed or incised decoration and straight, excurved or flaring rims.  Notched lips and rim lugs are also common.

Three specific types of Fisher ware were identified at Fifield:

 Fifield Trailed - characterized by trailed, closely spaced fine to medium horizontal and/or vertical lines over a cordmarked surface; often nested chevron motifs and/or punctates are also present.  Notched or crimped lips are common.  Some vessels have lugs or handles. 
 Fifield Bold - same as Fifield Trailed, with the lines wider and possibly made by the finger rather than an incising tool. 
 Fisher Cordmarked - one vessel was found with plain cordmarked surface without decoration, which is rare in the Fisher tradition.

Miniature vessels were also present at Fifield.  These are common at other sites in the area and could be interpreted as “toy” pots or attempts by young children to practice making pottery.

Several sherds of Langford Ware, an Upper Mississippian culture from northwestern Illinois, were also present. These sherds were grit-tempered, with either cordmarked or smoothed-over cordmarked surfaces, and are interpreted as trade ware.

Significance 

The Fifield site is a single-component Upper Mississippian Fisher site.  The pottery styles, along with the presence of certain artifacts such as the copper serpent, sherd disk and weeping eye sherd pendant, indicate the site was occupied almost to the time of European contact.  Based upon the type of plant remains and animal bones, and the presence of numerous storage pits, the excavators felt that the season of occupation was fall and winter, and that the site was a semi-permanent agricultural village. No evidence of maize was recovered, but there was no effort made by the excavators to systematically collect plant remains.

References

Further reading

Archaeological sites in Indiana